Guangdong–Hong Kong Cup of 2007–08 was the 30th staging of this two-leg competition between Hong Kong and Guangdong.

The first leg was played in Hong Kong on 30 December 2007 and the second leg was played in Guangzhou on 6 January 2008.

Hong Kong captured the trophy by winning an aggregate 4–0.

Squads

Hong Kong
 Head of Delegation: Timothy Fok 霍震霆, Brian Leung 梁孔德, Pui Kwan Kay 	貝鈞奇
 Deputy Head of Delegation: Allen Lee 李鵬飛, Lawrence Yu 余锦基, Bruce Mok 莫邦棟, Lam Kin Ming 林建名, Koon Wing Yee 官永義, Ken Ng 伍健, Chau How Chen 周厚澄
 Team manager: Lo Kit Sing 羅傑承, Chow Man Leung	周文亮
 Administrative Manager: Tsang Wai Chung 曾偉忠, Lee Yun Wah 李潤華
 Coach:  Jose Luis 路爾斯
 Coach Assistant:  Rambo Jose Ricardo 列卡度
 Assistant coach: Lo Kai Wah 羅繼華, Lee Kin Wo 李健和
 Fitness coach: Chan Hiu Ming 陳曉明
 Goalkeeper coach: Liu Chun Fai 廖俊輝
 Physio: Lui Yat Hong 呂日康
 Team Assistant: Kwan Kon Sang 關幹生

Guangdong
Head of Delegation:
Zhao Shaoming 招少鳴
Secretary:
Zheng Junhui 鄭俊輝
Team Managers:
Ke Guohong 柯國洪, Kong Maosheng 孔茂勝, Ning ZhiXiong 寧智雄
Head coach:
Shen Xiangfu 沈祥福
Assistant coach:
Ye Zhibin 葉志彬, 艾丁
Physio
Mai Zhiyuan 麥志垣
Translator:
Yang Lei 楊磊

Fixtures
First Leg

Second Leg

Trivia
 It was the first time in the competition history that Hong Kong was able to beat Guangdong in both legs.
 4–0 was the biggest aggregate win for Hong Kong in the competition.
 The 3–0 win in the first leg was the biggest win for Hong Kong in a single match in the competition.
 It was the first time in the competition history that no Chinese players were able to score for both teams.
 All 4 goals were scored by 3 Brazilian players from Hong Kong League XI and they all played for Hong Kong First Division League team South China.
 The 3 scoring players wore the jerseys with the largest numbers in the team.

See also
 Guangdong-Hong Kong Cup
 Hong Kong First Division League 2007-08
 Hong Kong Senior Shield 2007-08
 Hong Kong League Cup 2007-08
 Hong Kong FA Cup 2007-08

References

External links
 YouTube video 第30届省港杯-广东队球员宣传片

 

Guangdong
2007-08
2008 in Chinese football